Blackjack is an unincorporated community in Cherokee County, located in the U.S. state of Texas. According to the Handbook of Texas, the community had a population of 47 in 2000. It is located within the Tyler-Jacksonville combined statistical area.

History
Robert Graves Stadler settled here in the 1840s from South Carolina and was also a Texas Revolution veteran. His nieces and nephews followed alongside other relatives and named the community Blackjack for the blackjack trees in the area. Blackjack Baptist Church was organized in 1875. The community grew when John W. Gray and Tom Upchurch opened a store here in 1916. Blackjack had two stores, a cotton gin, a garage, a church, and 100 residents at its zenith. The last store in the community closed in 1961 and the population went down to 75 five years later. It had a church and several scattered houses in 1990 and had a population of 47 in 2000.

Geography

Education
Blackjack had a log schoolhouse built around the time of the American Civil War and was still standing after World War I. After the second World War, it joined the Troup Independent School District.

Notable person 
 Bob Luman, country and rockabilly singer-songwriter

Notes

Unincorporated communities in Cherokee County, Texas
Unincorporated communities in Texas